The 2014 Six Nations Under 20s Championship was a rugby union competition held in   January, February and March 2014. France won the tournament and the Grand Slam while England won a Triple Crown.

Final table

Results

Round 1

Round 2

Round 3

Round 4

Round 5

References

2014
2014 rugby union tournaments for national teams
2013–14 in English rugby union
2013–14 in French rugby union
2013–14 in Irish rugby union
2013–14 in Welsh rugby union
2013–14 in Scottish rugby union
2013–14 in Italian rugby union
U-20
January 2014 sports events in Europe
February 2014 sports events in Europe
March 2014 sports events in Europe